Boa is a genus of boas found in Mexico, the Caribbean, and Central and South America. Five extant species, and one extinct, are currently recognized.

Etymology
The Online Etymology Dictionary says that the word comes from the "late 14c., "large snake," from Latin boa, type of large serpent mentioned in Pliny's "Natural History;" origin unknown (in medieval folk etymology the name was associated with Greek bous "ox")."

Species

) Not including the nominate subspecies.

Distribution and habitat
Boa species are found in northern Mexico through Central America (Belize, Guatemala, Honduras, El Salvador, Nicaragua, Costa Rica and Panama) to South America north of 35°S (Colombia, Ecuador, Peru, Venezuela, Guyana, Suriname, French Guiana, Brazil, Bolivia, Uruguay and Argentina). One species is present in the Lesser Antilles (Dominica and St. Lucia), on San Andrés, Providencia and many other islands along the Caribbean coasts of Mexico and Central and South America.

Taxonomy
Kluge (1991) moved the genera Sanzinia and Acrantophis into Boa, based on a phylogeny derived from morphological characters. However, it has since been shown that the Malagasy boids and Boa constrictor do not form a monophyletic group, and the lumping of Sanzinia, Acrantophis and Boa was, therefore, an error. These snakes are therefore correctly represented in their own genera: Sanzinia and Acrantophis.

To add further to the naming confusion, many species of snake in the family Boidae are known colloquially as "boas". Also, four subspecies of B. constrictor are recognized, each with a distinct common name.

References

Further reading

 Kluge AG. 1991. Boine Snake Phylogeny and Research Cycles. Misc. Pub. Museum of Zoology, Univ. of Michigan No. 178. 58 pp. PDF at University of Michigan Library. Accessed 11 July 2008.
 Vences M, Glaw F, Kosuch J, Böhme W, Veith M. 2001. Phylogeny of South American and Malagasy Boine Snakes: Molecular Evidence for the Validity of Sanzinia and Acrantophis and Biogeographic Implications. Copeia No 4. p. 1151-1154. PDF at Miguel Vences. Accessed 29 August 2008.
 Vences M, Glaw F. 2003. Phylogeography, systematics and conservation status of boid snakes from Madagascar (Sanzinia and Acrantophis). Salamandra, Reinbach, 39(3/4): p. 181-206. PDF at Miguel Vences. Accessed 29 August 2008.

External links

 
 
 
 iNaturalist page

 
Snake genera
Taxa named by Carl Linnaeus